HMS Dido was a Royal Navy (RN)  frigate. Entering service in 1961, Dido was involved in the Indonesia–Malaysia confrontation, served with NATO's Standing Naval Force Atlantic on several occasions, and was one of the frigates used for the filming of the drama series Warship.

Following a defence review at the start of the 1980s, the ship was transferred to the Royal New Zealand Navy (RNZN), and was recommissioned as HMNZS Southland. Southland remained in service until 1995. After decommissioning the frigate was towed to the Philippines where her boilers were removed, and then sent to India for scrapping.

Construction
Dido was built by Yarrow of Glasgow. The naming ceremony for Dido took place on 21 December 1961, but her launch was delayed until the next day because of fog. Dido was commissioned on 18 September 1963. Total construction cost was £4600000.

Displacement was  standard and  full load.

A twin 4.5-inch (113 mm) Mark 6 gun mount was fitted forward. While the Leander-class was planned to be fitted with the Sea Cat surface-to-air missile, Dido was completed with two Bofors 40 mm anti-aircraft guns as a temporary substitute until Sea Cat could be fitted. A Limbo anti-submarine mortar was fitted aft to provide a short-range anti-submarine capability, while a hangar and helicopter deck allowed a single Westland Wasp helicopter to be operated, for longer range anti-submarine and anti-surface operations.

As built, Dido was fitted with a large Type 965 long range air search radar on the ship's mainmast, with a Type 993 short range air/surface target indicating radar and Type 974 navigation radar carried on the ship's foremast. An MRS3 fire control system was carried to direct the 4.5-inch guns. The ship had a sonar suite of Type 177 medium range search sonar, Type 162 bottom search and Type 170 attack sonar, together with a Type 199 variable depth sonar (VDS).

Royal Navy Service
The ship was assigned to the Far East, joining the 22nd Escort Group in 1964 and took part in the Indonesia–Malaysia confrontation, and became leader of the 21st Escort Group the following year.

Dido was reassigned to the NATO Standing Naval Force Atlantic (STANAVFORLANT) in 1969 and also took part in a fleet review at Spithead on 16 May 1969 as part of the celebrations of the 20th anniversary of the formation of NATO.

The ship was one of four used as the fictional frigate HMS Hero in the 1970s BBC television drama series Warship.

Dido was extensively refitted at Devonport between July 1975 and October 1978, as a Batch 1B Ikara conversion (and the last to be completed), at a cost of £23,000,000. An Ikara ASW missile launcher replaced the 4.5-inch turret, while two Sea Cat launchers were fitted to the hangar roof. The two Bofors guns were retained but moved forward to abreast the ship's mainmast. The Limbo anti-submarine mortar and Wasp helicopter was retained. The long-range Type 965 radar was removed, with improved navigation and target indicating radars fitted, and the ADAWS 5 computer aided combat direction system added to direct Ikara operations. The ship's sonar suite remained unchanged.

After working up following the refit, Dido joined the 3rd Frigate Squadron. In 1983 the ship was briefly assigned again to the Standing Naval Force Atlantic (STANAVFORLANT).

Royal New Zealand Navy Service
As a result of the 1981 Defence Review, which had recommended the disposal of some older frigates, the ship was sold to the RNZN, along with sister ship . The already 18-year-old Southland was selected mainly to train RNZN personnel on computerised command and control systems, even though the ADWAS 5 system was dated with only 4 screens and talley and a quarter of the processing capacity and screens of the later Leander and T21, C4 CAAIS. It is seen as a dubious purchase, in retrospect, and by some at the time, as an ageing, if recently refitted, 'over specialised anti submarine frigate' without any real surface armament or surveillance radar. The acquisition of the second hand frigate was also in direct conflict with the 1978 NZ Defence Review that decided that future frigates would be gas turbine powered and steam abandoned as a prime mover for RNZ combat ships.

Diesel powered long range frigates were also, offered in 1981, HMS Lynx and HMS Lincoln were rejected on account of age and lack of helicopter capability, the partly gas turbine powered HMS Zulu and HMS Norfolk which at least started and could leave port immediately, without 6/8 hours to flash up the steam boilers were rejected on the basis 'that they were already almost in the scrapyard'  (they were later sold to Indonesia and Chile) and excessive manning requirements, although all had 4.5 guns and 965AW radar and in the case of HMS Norfolk, full Link 10/11 USN compatible communications, high range and Exocet missiles. Given the extremely specialised nature of the Ikara Leanders and their incompatibility with the rather different Ikara systems in the Australian Type 12 frigates and  guided missile destroyers, the acquisition of two Ikara Leanders would actually have given a real capability, able to test and practice, joint computer age anti-submarine operations.

Southland received a five-month, $15 million refit at Vosper Thornycroft after recommissioning on 18 July 1983 as HMNZS Southland. During the refit the Limbo mortar and VDS were removed as were the associated 170 and 199 sonars, while US Mk 32 torpedo tubes for anti-submarine torpedoes were fitted. The refit was completed in late December 1983 and over the following months, Southland had several workups at Portland and participated in a number of Royal Navy and NATO exercises before sailing for New Zealand in mid-1984. An earlier  already had historical links with Southland.

Decommissioning and fate
Around 1986 extensive plans were drawn up for a major refit of Southland which would have allowed its Ikara capability to remain operational until the mid-1990s. The RN had significantly modernised one of its remaining Ikara Leanders,  at the time with long range 2031 towed array capable of passive detection in the 160 km + range zone. The Royal Australian Navy planned to continue with its similar, but incompatible, Ikara system for a while. However quotes for refitting Southland in UK yards or at Lyttleton proved high, the Cold War effectively ended in 1989 and with the RN and USN withdrawing its stock of nuclear depth charges, (the intended warhead option for RN Ikara Leanders to attack Soviet submarines at  range, where two directional sound transmission times were probably too great for accurate proximity direction of Ikara carrying MK 46 torpedoes) meant Ikara was no longer useful to the Royal Navy. As a result, the Ikara system was withdrawn from RNZN use in 1989 with space found for a low cost refit at the RNZN dockyard for it to continue as a General Purpose frigate until 1993.

Decommissioned in 1995, Southland was towed away by two patrol craft to the Philippines where her boilers were removed for a rubber plantation. She was then towed to Singapore where she was sold to an Indian tug company who took her to Goa beach in India. She was pulled up on the beach and her parts were sold.

See also
 Frigates of the Royal New Zealand Navy

References

Publications

Marriott, Leo, 1983.  Royal Navy Frigates 1945-1983, Ian Allan Ltd.

External links
 British Film Institute site on Warship
 Royal Navy leaflet on Warship, from the HMS Phoebe Association website
 Comments on Warship by series Director Michael Briant
 Webpage (at Home > Scriptwriting > Warship) about Michael J Bird's scripts for Warship
 HMS Dido Association website 

 

Leander-class frigates
Ships built on the River Clyde
1961 ships